Andrea Ferrero (18 Novembre 1903 - 10 June 1996) was an Italian diplomat.

Biography
Born in Bianzè (Vercelli) on 18 November 1903, Andrea Ferrero earned a degree in Law at the University of Turin in 1926. He joined Italy's foreign service in 1928. He served in Washington (1932-1933), in Pittsburg (1935-1936), in New York (1936-1938) as Deputy Consul, in Moscow (1938-1941) and in Athens (1941-1943). 

After the War he served in London as Second Secretary (1945-1947) where he dealt with the repatriation of Italian prisoners of war and in Cairo (1950-1954) as Counsellor. In 1954-1955 he was Consul General in Geneva and Italian Delegate to the United Nations in Geneva.

Ferrero became the Italian Ambassador to Uruguay, succeeding Enrico Martino, on 2 December 1958, and held that office until 1962, being succeeded by Lamberto Forino. He was Ambassador  of Italy to Czechoslovakia from September 1962 until April 1964. He later succeeded Ezio Mizzan as Italian Ambassador to Thailand,  holding the office from 1965 until 1 December 1968, being succeeded by Eugenio Rubino in 1969.

He died in Rome on 10 June 1996.

Honors
 Order of Merit of the Italian Republic 2nd Class / Grand Officer – 1962

See also
 Ministry of Foreign Affairs (Italy)
 Foreign relations of Italy

References

External links
 Photos of Andrea Ferrero in Immaginario Diplomatico - collection of historical photos of Italian Diplomats by Stefano Baldi
 

Ambassadors of Italy to Thailand
Ambassadors of Italy to Uruguay
Italian diplomats
Grand Officers of the Order of Merit of the Italian Republic
20th-century diplomats
1903 births
Year of death missing